Tan See Han (born 1910, date of death unknown) was an Indonesian football forward who played for the Dutch East Indies in the 1938 FIFA World Cup. He also played for Tiong Hoa Soerabaja.

References

External links
 

1910 births
Year of death missing
Indonesian footballers
Indonesia international footballers
Indonesian people of Chinese descent
Indonesian sportspeople of Chinese descent
Association football forwards
Tiong Hoa Soerabaja players
1938 FIFA World Cup players